Vasile Nicolae Constantin (born 18 January 1998) is a Romanian professional footballer who plays as a midfielder for FC Brașov.

Career statistics

Club

Honours
Universitatea Craiova
Cupa României: 2020–21
Supercupa României: 2021

References

External links
 
 

1998 births
Living people
Sportspeople from Craiova
Romanian footballers
Association football midfielders
Liga I players
CS Universitatea Craiova players
Liga II players
FC Brașov (2021) players